William George Bloomfield (25 August 1939 – September 2003) was an English footballer who played as an inside left in the Football League for Brentford.

Career 
Bloomfield joined Third Division South club Brentford at a young age and made his senior debut on 19 April 1957, in a 2–2 West London derby draw with Queens Park Rangers at Loftus Road. He made one further first team appearance against Coventry City in September 1957. Bloomfield spent much of his time at Griffin Park playing for the reserves, scoring 28 goals in 98 appearances. He retired in January 1960 due to failing eyesight and scored a hat-trick in his final reserve team match versus Gillingham.

Personal life 
Bloomfield's older brother Jimmy was also a professional footballer. He was diagnosed with a severe eye disorder in the late 1950s.

Career statistics

References

1939 births
2003 deaths
Footballers from Kensington
English footballers
Brentford F.C. players
English Football League players
Southern Football League players
Association football inside forwards